German submarine U-26 was one of the two Type IA ocean-going U-boats produced by Nazi Germany's Kriegsmarine. Constructed in Bremen, U-26 was commissioned in May 1936. She experienced a short, but successful combat career, sinking eleven ships.

Until 1940, U-26 was primarily used as training vessel and for propaganda purposes by the German government. During her trials it was found that the Type IA submarine was difficult to handle due to her poor stability and slow dive rate.

In early 1940, the boat was called into combat duty due to the shortage of available submarines. U-26 participated in six war patrols, sinking eleven ships and badly damaging one other. On her first patrol laying mines, U-26 sank three merchant ships and damaged one British warship. On her second war patrol it became the first U-boat during World War II to enter the Mediterranean Sea. U-26 participated in three other successful patrols, sinking four additional merchant ships.

Construction history
Laid down by DeSchiMAG AG Weser in Bremen as yard number 904 on 1 August 1935, U-26 was launched on 14 March 1936. She was commissioned on 6 May with Kapitänleutnant Werner Hartmann in command.

Operational history
U-26 carried out six patrols between August 1939 and July 1940, during which she sank or damaged 12 ships.

First patrol 
U-26 was one of the initial group of German submarines deployed to the Atlantic Ocean prior to the German invasion of Poland.  Oberkommando der Marine (OKM) had ordered her loaded with mines and to be ready to put in place a minefield in Portland Harbour.  Upon her completion of refit on 28 August, she put to sea with a load of mines and six torpedoes, under the command of Klaus Ewerth.  U-26 was positioned off of the western end of the English Channel awaiting final orders.  She was deemed unfit for combat duties but was none-the-less to stand ready to engage shipping with torpedoes upon completion of mining operations.  OKM conceived of the mission to deny the British a port of embarkation for transporting the British Army to France, but Karl Dönitz opposed the mission as too risky as the port was a major Royal Navy base, including their sonar school, and thus the harbor was bound to be well defended by antisubmarine forces.

With the war underway, on 4 September, U-26 began to penetrate the harbour but was slowed by antisubmarine patrols which were intense, as Dönitz had feared, and forced the first two attempts to be aborted.  It was not until four days later, on his third attempt, that Ewerth found a good position, known as the Shambles, to deploy his TMB mines.  After laying all the carried mines, he escaped to deeper water where the crew rested and loaded the six torpedoes in order to continue the patrol.  While moving westward, U-26 was hounded by British anti-submarine forces, preventing the boat's resumption of communications.  The Admiralty had claimed the sinking of a mine-laying U-boat on 8 September and attempts to contact U-26 went unanswered, leading Dönitz to fear that U-26 and her valuable Enigma machine may have been sunk in shallow waters from which they may be recovered by the British.  Consequently, orders were put out by OKM to change all Enigma settings and thereafter that mine-laying boats were not to carry Enigma.  U-26 however evaded the British forces and successfully reached the open Atlantic from which she was able to report her success to Dönitz.

While mine-laying was generally disliked by submariners for many reasons, this first minefield laid by U-boats in the war actually yielded a handsome return.  Three freighters totaling 17,414 tons were sunk (one each of Greek, Belgian, and Dutch nationality) and the corvette HMS Kittiwake was damaged severely, though this last result was successfully kept from the Germans.

Fate

The boat was scuttled southwest of Ireland after being badly damaged by depth charges dropped by the British Flower-class corvette  and an Australian Sunderland flying boat of No. 10 Squadron RAAF. The crew (48 men), all survived. However, 6 of them were killed on 22 July 1940, along with 2 British servicemen, when a Heinkel He 111 of Kampfgeschwader 26 jettisoned its remaining bombs when returning from an inshore anti-shipping sortie and accidentally hit POW Camp 5 at Duff House, Banff, Scotland.

In fiction
The U-boat in the film Raiders of the Lost Ark has the number U-26.  However, the film's submarine is a Type VIIC U-boat.  This is because the replica used was actually one of U-96, on loan from the makers of Das Boot.  Both movies were filming at the La Rochelle U-boat pens around the same time.

Summary of raiding history

References

Bibliography

External links

1936 ships
German Type I submarines
Ships built in Bremen (state)
U-boats commissioned in 1936
Maritime incidents in July 1940
U-boats scuttled in 1940
World War II shipwrecks in the Atlantic Ocean
World War II submarines of Germany
Military units and formations of Nazi Germany in the Spanish Civil War